{{Infobox gymnast
|name = Boryana Kaleyn
|image = 
|imagesize = 
|caption = 
|fullname = Boryana Nikolaeva Kaleyn
|altname = 
|nickname = Buba, Bubi
|country = 
|formercountry = 
|birth_date = 
|birth_place = Sofia, Bulgaria
|hometown = Sofia
|residence = Sofia
|height = 
|weight = 
|discipline = Rhythmic gymnastics
|level = Senior Elite
|natlteam = 2011 – present
|club= Levski Triaditsa
|gym=Rakovski  
|collegeteam=
|headcoach = Branimira Markova
|assistcoach = Mariana Pamukova
|formercoach = 
|choreographer = 
|music = 
|worldranking = 11 WC 19 WCC (2017 Season) 
|eponymousskills = 
|retired = 
|show-medals = yes
|medaltemplates= 

{{MedalCount
 | World Championships | 0|1|0
 | European Championships | 3|2|5
 | World Games | 1|1|0
 | FIG World Cup | 16|12|11
 | Grand Prix Series | 4|6|9
 | Total|24 |22|25}}

}}Boryana Nikolaeva Kaleyn' (born 23 August 2000) is a Bulgarian individual rhythmic gymnast. She is the 2022 European Champion with Ball, Ribbon and in the Team competition, Twice (2021 & 2022) European All-around silver medalist and the 2018 World Team silver medalist. At the 2019 European Championships she won three bronze medals. She competed at the 2020 Summer Olympics, in Rhythmic Gymnastics Individual all-around and finished on 5th place. On National level she is a four-time Bulgarian National Champion /2019, 2020, 2021 and 2022 year/.

 Career 
 Junior 
Kaleyn started rhythmic gymnastics at age six and began appearing in international junior competitions in 2008. She has competed in the Junior World Cup and the Junior Grand Prix events. On June 10–16, 2014, Kaleyn competed at the 2014 European Junior Championships with Team Bulgaria (together with Erika Zafirova and Katerina Marinova) finishing 4th, Kaleyn qualified 1 apparatus final and won the bronze medal in ball. Kaleyn won the all-around bronze at the 2015 Sofia Junior World Cup.

Senior
Kaleyn debuted as a senior in the 2016 season, she finished 10th in the all-around at the Baltic Hoop International tournament. In her next event she finished 4th in the all-around at the Lisbon Senior International Tournament, she qualified for all the apparatus finals taking silver in hoop, ribbon, clubs and silver in ball. She then finished 10th in the all-around at the Corbeil-Essonnes Cup.

In the 2017 season, Kaleyn competed at the Moscow senior International Tournament where she made a breakthrough winning silver in the all-around. She won bronze in the all-around at the 2017 Bulgarian National Championships behind Neviana Vladinova and Katrin Taseva who took the gold and silver medals respectively. She then competed at the 2017 Tashkent World Cup finishing 4th in the all-around behind teammate Katrin Taseva and qualified to three event finals taking bronze in clubs and placed 7th in hoop and ball. Her next competition was at the 2017 Baku World Cup where she finished 9th in the all-around behind Nicol Zelikman. On May 3–7, Kaleyn won gold in the all-around at the MT Sofia Cup. On May 12–1, Kaleyn competed at the 2017 World Challenge Cup in Portimao where she finished 4th in the all-around behind Victoria Veinberg Filanovsky, she qualified to three event finals taking bronze in clubs, finished 5th in hoop and 6th in ball. Kaleyn competed at the quadrennial held 2017 World Games in Wrocław, Poland from July 20 to 30, however she did not advance to any of the apparatus finals.

In the 2018 season, Kaleyn participated at the 2018 Grand Prix Moscow, finishing 10th in the all-around. She qualified to three finals, winning gold with ball, silver with hoop and bronze with ribbon. On March 30 – April 1, Kaleyn began the World Cup events competing at the 2018 Sofia World Cup finishing 6th in the all-around; she qualified in two apparatus finals, taking bronze in hoop and finishing 5th in ball. On March 23–25, Kaleyn competed at the 2018 Grand Prix Thiais, where she won the bronze medal in the all-around competition ahead of teammate Katrin Taseva. In the apparatus finals she won bronze with ball, clubs, finished 5th in hoop and 9th in ribbon. On April 20–22, at the 2018 Tashkent World Cup, Kaleyn finished 9th in the all-around and qualified to two apparatus finals: she won bronze in hoop and finished 8th in ribbon. On April 27–29, Kaleyn competed in a World Challenge Cup event at the 2018 Baku World Cup where she finished 9th in the all-around, she qualified in two apparatus finals taking silver in clubs and finished 4th in hoop. At the 2018 World Championships, held in her hometown of Sofia, Kaleyn won a silver medal with the Bulgarian team.

Kaleyn started her 2019 season competing at the GCP Lisbon senior International Tournament where she ranked 5th in the all-around. She qualified to two finals, winning gold with hoop and bronze with ball. On March 28 – April 1, she competed at the 2019 Grand Prix Thiais, where she placed 4th in the all-around behind Arina Averina, Linoy Ashram, and Dina Averina. She qualified for three apparatus finals, winning silver with ribbon and placing 5th with ball and 8th with hoop. Kaleyn then competed at the 2019 Pesaro World Cup, winning her first World Cup all-around medal by finishing in 3rd place behind Dina and Arina Averina. She qualified for three apparatus finals, winning silver in ball, placing 4th in hoop, and 5th in clubs. At the 2019 Tashkent World Cup, Kaleyn won silver in the all-around and qualified to all four apparatus finals; she won silver with ball and ribbon and finished 7th with clubs and 8th with hoop. On April 16–19, she competed in the 2019 European Championships with her teammates Katrin Taseva and Neviana Vladinova, with whom she won the bronze medal in the team event. She qualified for three apparatus finals, winning bronze in ball and ribbon and placing 7th with hoop.

In 2021, Boryana represented Bulgaria at the 2020 Summer Olympics and finished 5th in the Individual All-around Final.

 Style 

Kaleyn is distinctive in her approach to rhythmic gymnastics both for her routine music choices, which use a diverse array of styles from folk music to heavy metal and alternative rock. At the 2022 European Championships where she was successful at winning gold medals in the ribbon and ball apparatus finals, sport commentator Olly Hogben noted she was known for quickly discarding music she didn't have an affinity with. Additionally, a feature of her work is a strong display of pivots, such as fouette turns, often incorporating double and triple pirouettes in a sequence, and side scale pivots.

Routine music information

 Detailed Olympic results 

 Competitive highlights(Team competitions in seniors are held only at the World Championships, Europeans and other Continental Games.)''

References

External links 

 
 

2000 births
Living people
Gymnasts from Sofia
Bulgarian rhythmic gymnasts
Medalists at the Rhythmic Gymnastics World Championships
Medalists at the Rhythmic Gymnastics European Championships
Olympic gymnasts of Bulgaria
Gymnasts at the 2020 Summer Olympics
Competitors at the 2022 World Games
World Games gold medalists
21st-century Bulgarian women
World Games silver medalists